Drummond is a civil parish in Victoria County, New Brunswick, Canada.

For governance purposes it is divided between the town of Grand Falls, the town of Vallée-des-Rivières, and the Northwest rural district, both of which are members of the Northwest Regional Service Commission.

Before the 2023 governance reform, the parish was divided between the village of Drummond, the town of Grand Falls, and the local service district of the parish of Drummond.

Origin of name
The parish may have been named in honour of General Sir Gordon Drummond, former Governor General of the Canadas.

Drummond was originally a neighbour of Gordon Parish before the erections of Denmark and Lorne Parishes.

History
Drummond was erected in 1872 from Grand Falls Parish. It included Denmark Parish.

In 1875 the county line was altered and part of Drummond was transferred to Victoria County.

In 1927 the area within the municipal limits of the town of Grand Falls was removed from Drummond.

In 1936 much of Drummond was erected as Denmark Parish. Three months later the inland boundary was simplified, returning part of Denmark to Drummond.

In 1955 part of Drummond was added to the town of Grand Falls.

Boundaries
Drummond Parish is bounded:

 on the northeast by the Restigouche County line, running about 33 kilometres southeasterly from the northernmost point of Victoria County;
 on the southeast by a line beginning on the Restigouche County line at the prolongation of the southeastern line of the Fourth Tract of lands granted to the New Brunswick Railway Company, then running southwesterly along the prolongation, the Fourth Tract, and the First Tract to the northeastern line of the Seventh Tract, then southeasterly about 5.6 kilometres along the Seventh Tract and its prolongation to the prolongation of the southeastern line of Range 2 of the Burgess Settlement, then about 15 kilometres southwesterly, southeasterly, and southwesterly along the Burgess Settlement, Ennishone Settlement, and Block 52 to strike the Salmon River opposite the end of the Salmon River Road south of Davis Mill, then downstream to about 1.5 kilometres past Mill Hill Road to meet the southeastern line of a grant to John King, then southwesterly along the King grant past Route 105 to the northernmost corner of a grant to Lyman Whitehead, then southeasterly about 500 metres along the Whitehead grant, then southwesterly to the Saint John River at a point about 700 metres south of the mouth of Salmon River;
 on the west by the Saint John River;
 on the west by the Madawaska County line, running north-northeasterly and then true north to the starting point, the meeting point of Restigouche, Madawaska, and Victoria Counties;
excepting the Mill Lease of the War Department Lands, which are part of Grand Falls Town.

Communities
Communities at least partly within the parish. bold indicates an incorporated municipality

 Black Brook
 Burgess Settlement
 Caldwell
 Canton
 Davis Mill
 Desjardins Road
  Drummond
 Price Road
 Ennishone
  Grand Falls
 Hennigar Corner
 Jardine Brook
 McManus Siding
 Quatre-Coins
 Undine
 Violette Brook
 Violette Station

Bodies of water
Bodies of water at least partly within the parish.

 Grande Rivière
 Little River
 Little Main Restigouche River
  Saint John River
 Salmon River
 Lac à Minet
 Basley Lake
 Gounamitz Lake
 Gull Lake
 Hammond Lake
 Little Barkerhouse Lake
 Ryan Brook Lake
 Stony Lake

Other notable places
Parks, historic sites, and other noteworthy places at least partly within the parish.
 Boston Brook Airstrip
 Burgess Settlement Protected Natural Area
 Grand Falls Airport
 Petit Sault

Demographics
Parish population totals do not include village of Drummond and portion within Grand Falls

Population
Population trend

Language
Mother tongue (2016)

See also
List of parishes in New Brunswick
Little Main Restigouche River
Gounamitz River

Notes

References

Parishes of Victoria County, New Brunswick
Local service districts of Victoria County, New Brunswick